William Latsko  (born February 16, 1984) is a former American professional football player who was a fullback in the National Football League (NFL). He played college football for the University of Florida, and was a member of a BCS National Championship team.  Thereafter, he was signed by the NFL's Carolina Panthers as an undrafted free agent in 2007, and was also a member of the Pittsburgh Steelers and San Diego Chargers of the NFL, and the Virginia Destroyers of the United Football League (UFL).

Early years 
Latsko was born in Gainesville, Florida.  He attended Buchholz High School in Gainesville, and was a letterman in football, baseball, and weightlifting.  In football, as a junior, he was a third-team all-state selection; as a senior, he received first-team all-area and second-team all-state honors.  In baseball, he was a four-year letterman.  Latsko graduated from Buchholz High School in 2002.

College career 
Latsko accepted an athletic scholarship to attend the University of Florida in Gainesville, where he played for coach Ron Zook and coach Urban Meyer's Florida Gators football teams from 2002 to 2006.  As a senior in 2006, Latsko was a member of the Gators squad that defeated the Ohio State Buckeyes to win the BCS National Championship.  He majored in building construction.

Professional career 
Latsko was signed by the Virginia Destroyers of the United Football League on May 19, 2011.

See also 

 List of Florida Gators in the NFL Draft

Bibliography 
 Carlson, Norm, University of Florida Football Vault: The History of the Florida Gators, Whitman Publishing, LLC, Atlanta, Georgia (2007).  .

References

External links 
Florida Gators bio
Pittsburgh Steelers bio
San Diego Chargers bio

1984 births
Living people
Players of American football from Gainesville, Florida
American football fullbacks
Buchholz High School alumni
Florida Gators football players
Carolina Panthers players
Pittsburgh Steelers players
San Diego Chargers players
Virginia Destroyers players